Serranobatrachus carmelitae, also known as Carmelita's robber frog, is a species of frog in the family Strabomantidae. It is endemic to the north-western slopes of the Sierra Nevada de Santa Marta, in northern Colombia.
Its natural habitats are tropical riparian forests. It is threatened by habitat loss.

References

Amphibians of Colombia
Endemic fauna of Colombia
Taxa named by Alexander Grant Ruthven
Amphibians described in 1922
Taxonomy articles created by Polbot